The Redbone Coonhound is an American breed of hunting dog. The Redbone is a courageous hunter often used to track large game such as bear, boar, cougar, though is it also used to track smaller game such as deer. The breed dates back to pre-Civil War and is one of the most versatile of all the hounds. It originated in the Southern United States, and its foundation stock derives from bloodhounds and foxhounds brought by immigrants from Scotland. It is characterized by its deep red coat.

It has been registered with the United Kennel Club since 1902, and with the American Kennel Club since 2009.

History
In the early 19th century, Scottish immigrants brought red-colored foxhounds to Georgia, which would later become the foundation stock of today's modern-day Redbone. Around 1840, Irish-bred Foxhound and Bloodhound lines were added. The Redbone name comes from an early breeder, Peter Redbone of Tennessee, though the United Kennel Club credits Redbone's contemporary, George F.L. Birdsong of Georgia, and Dr. Thomas Henry in the 19th century.

Over time, breeders followed a selective program that led to a coonhound that was adept at treeing wild-game, was courageous against larger animals such as bear and mountain lions, agile enough to track in the mountains or in the marsh, and could swim if necessary (one of the few hounds with webbed feet). They are ideal for pack hunting of both small and larger prey. Originally, the Redbone had a black saddleback, but by the beginning of the 20th century, it was replaced by an uninterrupted red tone.

The Redbone Coonhound was recognized by the United Kennel Club in 1902, becoming the second coonhound breed to gain recognition and was recognized by the American Kennel Club in 2010.

Description 

The Redbone Coonhound has a lean, muscular, well proportioned build. The body type is typical to the coonhounds subgroup, with long straight legs, a deep chest, and a head and tail that are held high and proud when hunting or showing. The Redbone Coonhound has brown eyes and a face that is often described as having a pleading expression. The dog's eyes may be dark brown to hazel, but a darker color is preferred. The coat is short and smooth against the body, but coarse enough to provide protection to the skin while hunting through dense underbrush. Their large paws have especially thick pads, with webbed toes, and dewclaws are common. The nose is often black and prominent, with black on the muzzle and around the eyes, called "masking", not uncommon. The ears are floppy and will most likely extend to nearly the end of the nose if stretched out. The coat color is always a rich red, though a small amount of white on the chest, between the legs, or on the feet is sometimes seen. The white chest and feet markings that occasionally appear on Redbone Coonhound puppies today is most likely a throwback to the mixing of Bloodhound and Foxhound bloodlines. 

Weight should be proportional to the size and bone structure of the individual dogs, with a preference towards leaner working dogs rather than heavier dogs.

Like most hounds, the Redbone is an affectionate, gentle dog that strives to please its owner when not hunting.

References

Scent hounds
Dog breeds originating in the United States